Ozophora is a genus of dirt-colored seed bugs in the family Rhyparochromidae. There are more than 100 described species in Ozophora.

Species 
The following species are accepted within Ozophora:

 Ozophora agilis Slater, 1987
 Ozophora alayoi Slater, 1990
 Ozophora anguillensis Baranowski, 2005
 Ozophora angustata Barber, 1948
 Ozophora antennata Slater & O'Donnell, 1979
 Ozophora archboldi Slater, 1987
 Ozophora atropicta Barber, 1939
 Ozophora atropictoides Slater & Baranowski, 1995
 Ozophora attagenis Slater, 1983
 Ozophora auroseta Baranowski, 2005
 Ozophora australis Slater, 1995
 Ozophora badia Slater, 1995
 Ozophora baranowskii Slater & O'Donnell, 1979
 Ozophora barbudensis Baranowski, 2005
 Ozophora belezei Slater, 1995
 Ozophora brunnea Slater, 1983
 Ozophora burmeisteri (Guerin-Meneville, 1857) 
 Ozophora cacumena Slater, 2005
 Ozophora caliginosa Slater, 1990
 Ozophora caribbae Baranowski & Slater, 1984
 Ozophora caroli Slater & Baranowski, 1983
 Ozophora carvalhoi Slater & O'Donnell, 1979
 Ozophora caymana Baranowski, 2005
 Ozophora cobbeni Scudder, 1984
 Ozophora cocosensis Slater, 1981
 Ozophora coleoptrata Slater, 1990
 Ozophora concava (Distant, 1893) 
 Ozophora consanguinea (Distant, 1893) 
 Ozophora costaricensis Slater & O'Donnell, 1979
 Ozophora cubensis Barber, 1954
 Ozophora cuscoensis Slater, 1995
 Ozophora darlingtoni Slater, 1990
 Ozophora decora Slater, 1995
 Ozophora decora decora Slater, 1995
 Ozophora decora surinamensis Slater, 1995
 Ozophora depicturata Barber, 1928
 Ozophora divaricata Barber, 1954
 Ozophora dolichocephala Slater, 1995
 Ozophora dolicorostris Baranowski, 2005
 Ozophora englemani Slater, 1983
 Ozophora festiva Slater, 1983
 Ozophora floridana Slater & Baranowski, 1983
 Ozophora fuscipennis Baranowski, 2005
 Ozophora gilva Slater & Baranowski, 1983
 Ozophora graciliforma Baranowski, 2005
 Ozophora gracilipes (Stal, 1858) 
 Ozophora helenae Baranowski & Slater, 1984
 Ozophora heydoni Barber & Ashlock, 1960
 Ozophora hirsuta Slater & Baranowski, 1979
 Ozophora hispaniola Slater, 1990
 Ozophora hohenbergia Slater & Baranowski, 1978
 Ozophora inca Slater, 1995
 Ozophora insulanus Slater, 2005
 Ozophora irrorata Slater, 1995
 Ozophora josephina Slater & Baranowski, 1979
 Ozophora laticephala Slater & O'Donnell, 1979
 Ozophora levis Slater & Baranowski, 1983
 Ozophora longirostris Slater & Baranowski, 1979
 Ozophora maculata Slater & O'Donnell, 1979
 Ozophora maculosa Slater, 1983
 Ozophora majas Baranowski & Slater, 1984
 Ozophora minuscula Scudder, 1958
 Ozophora nana Slater, 1986
 Ozophora neotropicalis Slater, 1995
 Ozophora nitida Slater, 1987
 Ozophora notabilis Slater, 1983
 Ozophora occidentalis Slater, 1988
 Ozophora octomaculata Ramos, 1946
 Ozophora ovalis (Dallas, 1852) 
 Ozophora pallescens (Distant, 1893) 
 Ozophora pallidifemur Scudder, 1958
 Ozophora pallidifemur fuscifemur Scudder, 1958
 Ozophora pallidifemur pallidifemur Scudder, 1958
 Ozophora paranana Slater, 1995
 Ozophora parapicta Slater & Hassey, 1981
 Ozophora parimpicta Baranowski, 2005
 Ozophora parva Slater, 1983
 Ozophora peruviana Slater & O'Donnell, 1979
 Ozophora picturata Uhler, 1871
 Ozophora psarocoris Baranowski, 2005
 Ozophora pseudimpicta Baranowski, 2005
 Ozophora pusilla Slater, 1990
 Ozophora quinquemaculata Barber, 1939
 Ozophora quinquemaculata quinquemaculata Barber, 1939
 Ozophora quinquemaculata subtilis Slater, 1987
 Ozophora rawlinsi Slater, 2005
 Ozophora reperta Blatchley, 1926
 Ozophora robusta Slater, 1983
 Ozophora rubra Slater, 1995
 Ozophora rubrolinea Slater, 1987
 Ozophora rubronotata Slater, 1995
 Ozophora sabensis Baranowski, 2005
 Ozophora salsaverdeae Slater, 1988
 Ozophora schaffneri Slater, 1995
 Ozophora scutellata Slater, 1983
 Ozophora similis Slater & O'Donnell, 1979
 Ozophora singularis Slater, 1983
 Ozophora slateri Baranowski, 1987
 Ozophora subimpicta Barber, 1939
 Ozophora sylvana Slater, 1995
 Ozophora testacea Slater, 1990
 Ozophora triangularis Slater, 2005
 Ozophora trinidadensis Baranowski, 2005
 Ozophora trinotata Barber, 1914
 Ozophora umbrosa Slater, 1987
 Ozophora unicolor Uhler, 1894
 Ozophora vandoesburgi Slater, 1995
 Ozophora variegata (Kirby, 1890) 
 Ozophora vasquezae Slater, 1986
 Ozophora venusta Slater, 2005
 Ozophora versicolor Slater, 1983
 Ozophora villosa Slater, 1983
 Ozophora woodruffi Woodruff & Slater, 2012
 Ozophora xanthocnemis Baranowski, 2005

References

External links

 

Rhyparochromidae
Articles created by Qbugbot